The following is a list of Teen Choice Award winners and nominees for Choice Sci-Fi/Fantasy TV Show. This award was first introduced (along with Choice Sci-Fi/Fantasy TV Actor and Choice Sci-Fi/Fantasy TV Actress) in 2010. The Vampire Diaries was the first recipient of the award.

The Vampire Diaries is the all-time winner in this category, with seven wins of eight nominations. Supernatural hold the record with most nominations (tied with The Vampire Diaries) without a single win (8 each). 

Currently the last TV Show awarded as Choice Sci-Fi/Fantasy is Shadowhunters in 2019.

Winners and nominees

2010s

Series with multiple wins 
The followings TV series received two or more Choice Sci-Fi/Fantasy awards:

7 Wins

 The Vampire Diaries

2 Wins

 Shadowhunters

Series with multiple nominations 
The followings TV series received two or more Choice Sci-Fi/Fantasy nominations:

8 Nominations 

 The Vampire Diaries
 Supernatural

5 Nominations

 Once Upon A Time

4 Nominations

 Arrow

3 Nominations

 Fringe
 Shadowhunters
 Teen Wolf
 The 100

2 Nominations

 iZombie
 Smallville
 Sleepy Hollow
 Stranger Things

References

Sci-Fi/Fantasy TV Show